Freedom of Speech: Lessons from Lenny Bruce is a work of theatre written by Amanda Faye Martin and devised and directed by Sam Weisman along with the cast. It is a play that focuses on the modern politically charged time, in which a comedy club becomes the last bastion for freedom of speech as six college students navigate the inherent boundaries of inclusivity. The play was influenced by the works of comedian Lenny Bruce and the newly opened Lenny Bruce collection at the Robert D. Farber Archives at Brandeis University. The play premiered at Brandeis University on 10/26/16, and was then featured at a variety of venues around the Greater Boston area.

The play was produced by Robert Walsh and the Brandeis Department of Theater Arts, along with funding by Mass Humanities, which receives support from the Massachusetts Humanities Cultural Council and is an affiliate of the National Endowment for the Humanities.

Development and Lenny Bruce 
Freedom of Speech: Lessons from Lenny Bruce draws heavily from the works of Lenny Bruce. Personal photographs, papers, and recordings, were all used while the script and play was in development.

The collection was accessed through Brandeis University which acquired the collection from Lenny Bruce’s daughter Kitty Bruce in 2014. The collection, and events, were supported by the Hugh M. Hefner Foundation, the Louis D. Brandeis Legacy Fund and the ACLU Foundation of Massachusetts.

Productions 
Premiere - Brandeis University, Waltham

2nd Showing - Cambridge Multicultural Arts Center], Cambridge

3rd Showing - Arsenal Center for the Arts, Watertown

4th Showing - Gloucester Stage Company, Gloucester

5th Showing - The Rockwell, Davis Square/Somerville

6th Showing - The Hershel, Watertown

Original cast 
The Original Cast featured Savannah Edmonds, Kate Farrell, Jacob Kleinberg, Yair Koas, Laura Marasa, Donald Phi Phi, and Gabi Nail, as the lead students.

Comedian Corey Rodrigues played the owner of the comedy club.

References 

2016 plays
American plays
Plays based on real people
Cultural depictions of Lenny Bruce